The Civil Aviation Act 2006 (c 34) is an Act of the Parliament of the United Kingdom.

Section 14 - Short title, commencement and extent
This section came into force on 8 November 2006.

The Civil Aviation Act 2006 (Commencement No. 1) Order 2007 (S.I. 2007/598 (C. 25)) was made under section 14(3).

References
Halsbury's Statutes,

External links
The Civil Aviation Act 2006, as amended from the National Archives.
The Civil Aviation Act 2006, as originally enacted from the National Archives.
Explanatory notes to the Civil Aviation Act 2006.

United Kingdom Acts of Parliament 2006
2006 in aviation
Aviation law
Transport law in the United Kingdom
Civil aviation in the United Kingdom
Aviation history of the United Kingdom
Transport legislation